Twining is the process of interlacing strands as if to make twine.

Twining may also refer to:

Places

United States
Twining, Michigan, a village
Twining, New Mexico, an unincorporated community
Twining, Washington, D.C., a neighborhood

People
Twining (surname)

Other uses
 Twining basketry, a type of basket-weaving 

Twining Models, an English model-making firm
Twining v. New Jersey, 1908 U.S. Supreme Court case concerning Fifth Amendment rights
USS Twining (DD-540), American Fletcher-class destroyer

Vines growing upwards by revolving around and leaning on a supporting structure

See also
Twinings, a British tea brand
Twinning (disambiguation)